Satu Auno, née Hoikkala (born 14 January 1980) is a Finnish retired ice hockey player. She competed with the Finnish national team in 92 international matches, including the women's ice hockey tournaments at the 2002 Winter Olympics and the 2006 Winter Olympics.

References

External links

1980 births
Living people
Finnish women's ice hockey forwards
Olympic ice hockey players of Finland
Ice hockey players at the 2002 Winter Olympics
Ice hockey players at the 2006 Winter Olympics
Sportspeople from Vantaa
Oulun Kärpät Naiset players